CDC34 is a gene that in humans encodes the protein Ubiquitin-conjugating enzyme E2 R1. This protein is a member of the ubiquitin-conjugating enzyme family, which catalyzes the covalent attachment of ubiquitin to other proteins.

CDC34 was originally discovered by work in baker's yeast as a gene that is essential for the cell cycle. Cdc34 in yeast targets numerous substrates - notably the cyclin-dependent kinase inhibitor Sic1 - for ubiquitin-mediated protein degradation. CDC34 is required for ubiquitin-mediated degradation of cell cycle G1 regulators, and for the initiation of DNA replication.

Interactions 

CDC34 has been shown to interact with CSNK2B, BTRC and CDK9.

References

External links

Further reading